Carlos Melgar (born 4 November 1994) is a Bolivian footballer who play for Club Bolivar .

Melgar made his senior international debut for the Bolivia national football team on the 13 October 2018 against Myanmar a 3-0 victory at the Thuwanna YTC Stadium.

References

Living people
1994 births
Bolivian footballers
C.D. Jorge Wilstermann players
Association footballers not categorized by position
Bolivia international footballers